Haslau-Maria Ellend is a municipality in the district of Bruck an der Leitha in Lower Austria in Austria.

Geography 
Haslau-Maria Ellend lies in the industrial area of Lower Austria. About 42 percent of the municipality is forested.

References 

Cities and towns in Bruck an der Leitha District